Kantatar (Barbed Wire) is a 2005 Bengali film directed by  Bappaditya Bandopadhyay,  and featuring Sreelekha Mitra, Sudip Mukherjee, Rudranil Ghosh. It received NETPAC Award at Vesoul International Film Festival of Asian Cinema, 2007 for its deceptively simple style with which the complex situation of people trapped in a state of permanent displacement is exposed.

Plot

Kantatar (Barbed Wire) revolves around the journey of Sudha (Sreelekha Mitra), a socio-political-love drama, Kantatar centers on an illegal immigrant's search for identity and her effort to survive sake and in search of an identity, moves from one man to another and from one religion to another. The sudden threat of cross border terrorism entirely changes the socio-political situation in a remote village close to the frontier, the army rolls into town, and the drastic changes take their toll on inter-personal relationships as they are marred by suspicion, competition and fear. Sudha takes refuge in a temporary weather camp just outside the village. She develops a physical relationship with Binod (Sudip Mukherjee), the weather balloonist, whose job it is to take note of the frequent change of wind direction. But soon Sudha's identity comes into question and she is seen as a suspect. Her dream of a secure shelter is once again threatened. This is a beautiful and engaging film, which luxuriates in the story and its location. The visual poetry and unfettered exploration of the ongoing conflict on the borders of India and Bangladesh come together with great impact and insight. There are brilliant touches of both satire and social comment, which go to show that Bappaditya Bandhopadhay has a lot to say about today's India. Sudha's hard life consists of weaving herself in and out of different relationships with men and dabbling in various religions. The immediate threat of attack entirely changes the climate of her remote border village, and as the army rolls into town, inter-personal relationships are drastically affected. Suspicion, competition and fear start to grip the villagers. Sudha takes refuge in a temporary weather camp just outside the village. Binod, a meteorologist working in the village, becomes fascinated by Sudha, and they soon begin a physical relationship. But when Sudha's identity is called into question, she is seen as a terrorist suspect. Her dreams of security are once again threatened. Kantatar is visually engaging, luxuriating in the lush locales where it was filmed. Director Bappaditya Bandhopadhay relies on both satire and social comment to tell his story, all the while exploring the ongoing conflict on the borders of India and Bangladesh. Modern India is portrayed with great impact and insight.

Cast

Sreelekha Mitra ... Sudha
Sudip Mukherjee ... Binod
Rupsha Guha
Rudranil Ghosh
Iqbal Sultan
Nimai Ghosh
Papiya Ghosal
Pradip Bhattacharya
Rupsa Ghosh
Shankar Debnath
Sudin Adhikari

Critical reception

Though a favourite with foreign festivals (the poster screams that the film has already been to five international fests), Kantatar could have done with a little more finesse.-The Telegraph (4 stars out of 10)

Awards

Fribourg International Film Festival, Switzerland, 2006
São Paulo International Film Festival, Brazil, 2006
Singapore International Film Festival, 2006
Raindance International Film Festival, London, U.K. 2005
Ashdod International Film Festival, Tel Aviv, Israel, 2006
Bangladesh International Film Festival, Dhaka, 2006
Inaugural film, International Forum of new cinema, Kolkata International Film Festival, India, 2005
Inaugural film Chittagong International Film Festival, Bangladesh 2005
Osian Cinefan Festival of Asian Cinema, New Delhi, India 2005
Mumbai International Film Festival, India, 2006
Pune International Film Festival, India, 2005
Habitat International Film Festival, New Delhi, India, 2005
Festival des Cinémas d'Asie, Vesoul, 2007
Silk screen Festival of Asian Cinema, Pittsburg, U.S.A. 2007
Anandaloke Award for Best Actress.
B.F.J.A. Awards for Best Cinematographer, Best Actress and Best Supporting Actor.
Partha Pratim Chowdhury Award for Best Film and Best Director.

World Sales: Wide Management Ltd. France

References

External links
 

2005 films
Bengali-language Indian films
2000s Bengali-language films
Films directed by Bappaditya Bandopadhyay